Bothersome was an unincorporated community in Stone County, Arkansas, United States. Its post office   is closed.

References

Unincorporated communities in Stone County, Arkansas
Unincorporated communities in Arkansas